Benjamin Franklin Murphy (December 24, 1867 – March 6, 1938) was a U.S. Representative from Ohio from 1919 to 1933.

Biography 
Born in Steubenville, Ohio to Charles F. Murphy and Mary E. (née Beasley) Murphy, he attended the public schools.  He learned the glassworker's trade, and later engaged in the retail shoe business, in banking, and in the real estate business.  He served as vice president of the Peoples National Bank.  During the First World War, Murphy served with YMCA, stationed at Camp Sheridan, Montgomery, Alabama, in 1917 and 1918.

Congress 
Murphy was elected as a Republican to the Sixty-sixth and to the six succeeding Congresses (March 4, 1919 – March 3, 1933).  He served as chairman of the Committee on Expenditures in the Department of Commerce (Sixty-seventh Congress).  He was an unsuccessful candidate for reelection in 1932 to the Seventy-third Congress and for election in 1934 to the Seventy-fourth Congress.

Personal life 
Murphy was married three times and widowed twice.  His second wife, Mame M. née Barcus, died in an automobile accident in Florida in April 1929.  About a year later, he married a local divorcee, Marie E. (née Williams) Clerk in Washington, DC. The ceremony took place at her home and was presided over by her brother-in-law, Rev. William Clews.

Death 
Murphy resided in Washington, D.C.  He died in Takoma Park, Maryland, March 6, 1938.  He was interred in Union Cemetery, Steubenville, Ohio.

Sources

References

1867 births
1938 deaths
Politicians from Steubenville, Ohio
American bankers
Burials at Union Cemetery-Beatty Park
Republican Party members of the United States House of Representatives from Ohio